Chryseobacterium rhizosphaerae is an bacterial species found in the rhizospheres of coastal sand dune plants. It is Gram-negative, non-spore-forming and non-motile. Its type strain is RSB3-1T (=KCTC 22548T =NBRC 105248T).

References

Further reading
Sang, Mee Kyung, et al. "Chryseobacterium kwangjuense sp. nov., isolated from pepper (Capsicum annuum L.) root." International Journal of Systematic and Evolutionary Microbiology 63.Pt 8 (2013): 2835–2840.
Pridgeon, J. W., P. H. Klesius, and J. C. Garcia. "Identification and virulence of Chryseobacterium indologenes isolated from diseased yellow perch (Perca flavescens)." Journal of Applied Microbiology 114.3 (2013): 636–643.
Kämpfer, Peter, John A. McInroy, and Stefanie P. Glaeser. "Chryseobacterium zeae sp. nov., Chryseobacterium arachidis sp. nov., and Chryseobacterium geocarposphaerae sp. nov. isolated from the rhizosphere environment." Antonie van Leeuwenhoek 105.3 (2014): 491–500.

External links

LPSN
Type strain of Chryseobacterium rhizosphaerae at BacDive -  the Bacterial Diversity Metadatabase

rhizosphaerae
Bacteria described in 2011